The 2018 Philippine Basketball Association (PBA) Governors' Cup Finals was the best-of-7 championship series of the 2018 PBA Governors' Cup, and the conclusion of the conference's playoffs. The  Alaska Aces and the Magnolia Hotshots competed for the 18th Governors' Cup championship and the 124th overall championship contested by the league.

Due to the preparations of the Philippines men's national basketball team for the fifth window of the 2019 FIBA World Cup Qualifiers, the start of this finals series started on December 5, 2018; two weeks after the semifinal round finished.

Background

Road to the finals

Head-to-head matchup

Series summary

Game 1

Game 2

Game 3

Game 4

Game 5

Game 6

Rosters

{| class="toccolours" style="font-size: 95%; width: 100%;"
|-
! colspan="2" style="background-color: #; color: #; text-align: center;" | Magnolia Hotshots 2018 PBA Governors' Cup roster
|- style="background-color:#EB1B22; color: #FFFFFF; text-align: center;"
! Players !! Coaches
|-
| valign="top" |
{| class="sortable" style="background:transparent; margin:0px; width:100%;"
! Pos. !! # !! POB !! Name !! Height !! Weight !! !! College 
|-

{| class="toccolours" style="font-size: 95%; width: 100%;"
|-
! colspan="2" style="background-color: #; color: #; text-align: center;" | Alaska Aces 2018 PBA Governors' Cup roster
|- style="background-color:#; color: #; text-align: center;"
! Players !! Coaches
|-
| valign="top" |
{| class="sortable" style="background:transparent; margin:0px; width:100%;"
! Pos. !! # !! POB !! Name !! Height !! Weight !! !! College 
|-

  also serves as Alaska's board governor.

Broadcast notes
The Governors' Finals is aired on The 5 Network (TV5) with simulcasts on PBA Rush (both in standard and high definition). TV5's radio arm, Radyo5 provides the radio play-by-play coverage. 

Sports5 also provide online livestreaming via their official YouTube and Facebook accounts using the TV5 feed.

The PBA Rush broadcast will provide English-language coverage of the Finals.

Additional Game 6 crew:
Trophy presentation: 
Dugout celebration interviewer: Apple David

References

External links
PBA official website

2018
2017–18 PBA season
PBA Governors' Cup Finals
Alaska Aces (PBA) games
Magnolia Hotshots games